Parmotrema andinum is a species of lichen in the family Parmeliaceae. It was first described as new to science in 1879 by Johannes Müller Argoviensis as a species of Parmelia. Mason Hale transferred it to Parmotrema in 1975. It is found in Africa, Asia, and South America. In Mauritania, this species is used as tobacco. A metabolomic analysis of this lichen revealed the presence of 30 secondary compounds.

See also
List of Parmotrema species

References

andinum
Lichen species
Lichens described in 1879
Lichens of Africa
Lichens of Asia
Lichens of South America
Taxa named by Johannes Müller Argoviensis